Pallixouriakos Football Club is a Greek football club, based in Lixouri, Cephalonia, Greece

The Historic Season in the Gamma Ethniki (third tier of Greek football) 
In the 2017-18 season, in the historic participation of Pallixouriakos in the Gamma Ethniki, the club finished penultimate in the 11th place of the 5th Group and was relegated. In 22 games the team got 3 wins, 4 draws and 15 losses

Pallixouriakos - Leonidio 1-0

Pallixouriakos - PAO Vardas 3-2

Pallixouriakos - Kalamata 1-1

Leonidio - Pallixouriakos 1-1

Pallixouriakos - Achaiki 1-1

Paniliakos - Pallixouriakos 1-1

Pallixouriakos - Pylos Tsiklitiras 3-1

Rivalries 
The main rivals of Pallixouriakos are AO Pronnon, Dilinata, Asteras Lixouriou, Ethnikos Kefalonia, Evgeros and formerly Olympiakos Kefalonia.

Honours

Domestic

  Kefalonia-Ithaca FCA Champions: 9
 1985–86, 1989–90, 1993–94, 1996–97, 1998–99, 2000–01, 2005–06, 2016–17, 2019–20
  Kefalonia-Ithaca FCA Cup Winners: 5
 1990–91, 1997–98, 2000–01, 2017–18, 2018–19

References

Cephalonia
Association football clubs established in 1950
1950 establishments in Greece
Gamma Ethniki clubs